Bazanchatovo (Baźansat) is a rural locality (a village) in Askinsky District, Bashkortostan, Russia. The population was 245 as of 2010. There are 5 streets.

Geography 
Bazanchatovo is located 49 km north of Askino (the district's administrative centre) by road. Ulu-Yelga is the nearest rural locality.

References 

Rural localities in Askinsky District